The Central Office District is the central business district for Downtown Richmond, Virginia. The district contains a majority of the city core, with several high rises situated in this region of the city. The District houses the Richmond Federal Reserve Bank, Dominion Virginia Power's corporate headquarters, Kanawha Plaza and the Virginia Tourism Corporation. U.S. Route 60 (South 9th Street) is the main street through the district.

See also 
 Downtown Richmond, Virginia
 Richmond, Virginia

External links 
 Central Office District boundaries

Neighborhoods in Richmond, Virginia